Kirban, New South Wales is a bounded rural locality of Gilgandra Shire and a civil parish of Gowen County, New South Wales.

Location
The Parish is on the Wallumburrawang Creek a tributary of the Castlereagh River, and the nearest settlement of the parish is Tooraweenah, New South Wales to the west.

History
The parish is on the traditional lands of the Weilwan Aboriginal people. The parish was named for The Kirban run established in the 19th century.

References

Localities in New South Wales
Geography of New South Wales
Central West (New South Wales)